Val-d'Oronaye is a commune in the Alpes-de-Haute-Provence department of southeastern France. The municipality was established on 1 January 2016 and consists of the former communes of Meyronnes and Larche.

References

See also 
Communes of the Alpes-de-Haute-Provence department

Valdoronaye
Communes nouvelles of Alpes-de-Haute-Provence
Populated places established in 2016

2016 establishments in France